The British Rail Class 69 is a class of diesel locomotives which are converted from  locomotives. The conversion work is performed by Progress Rail at their workshop in Longport.

The Class 69 was developed to fulfil the needs of the rail freight operator GB Railfreight (GBRf), which was unable to purchase additional Class 66 diesel locomotives yet sought more capacity in a similar performance band. The conversion of surplus Class 56s, which were available in sufficient quantity and in good enough condition to make the class a good candidate for the project, proved to be a desirable option, being more affordable than new build locomotives while achieving similar performance to the Class 66 post-conversion. Many of the new systems installed are similar, or identical, to those present on the Class 66, including its EMD 710 powerplant and associated control systems; this was a deliberate choice in order to maximise the performance similarities. Retained elements were refurbished to an as-new condition.

History

Background 
During 2000, the rail freight haulage company GB Railfreight (GBRf) obtained its first Class 66 diesel locomotive; determining the type's performance to be ideal to its purposes, procured it in large numbers; by 2021, GBRf's fleet of roughly 130 locomotives was dominated by 99 Class 66s. According to Bob Tiller, GBRf's Engineering Strategy Director, while the Class 66 was affordable and considerably more reliable than its British-built counterparts, the locomotive was effectively unobtainable by the late 2010s due to its non-compliance with the latest National Technical Specification Notices. Thus, while the company sought to continue its growth, its preferred option had become unavailable other than by acquiring second-hand examples.

During the 2010s, it was observed that there were no in-production diesel locomotives available at the time that could be deliver the desired performance while also fitting within the UK's restrictive loading gauge. Furthermore, designing one would necessitate the placing of a large and costly order that came with some risk, as a suitably compliant engine may not even fit the UK gauge at all, while an active decarbonisation strategy that sought to eliminate all diesel trains from the railway by 2040 would thus limit its lifespan considerably. Instead, GBRf examined the prospects for the conversion of existing rolling stock, akin to the reengining of the  into the Class 57. Class 56, Class 58, and Class 60 freight locomotives were all studied; the Class 58 was quickly dismissed due to few examples remaining, while the Class 60s were mostly owned by other companies. The more numerous Class 56 thus became the preferred option.

The company sought out available Class 56s in the hands of other companies. Priority was given to those locomotives that were in good enough condition to still be moved by rail, necessitating the bogies, suspension, wheelsets, and brake equipment being functional. However, little value was placed on items such as its diesel engine or most of the control systems, which were to be replaced with systems similar, or identical, to those installed on the Class 66. During June 2018, GBRf purchased 16  locomotives from UK Rail Leasing, many of which had been out of use for a number of years. Additionally, 56106 was acquired in an incomplete state as a source of spares and 56128 from metal recycler CF Booth.

Project launch 
In April 2019, GBRf announced that the locomotives would be rebuilt as Class 69s by Progress Rail at its Longport facility. Initial work involved the stripping of all removable parts from each locomotive and the overhauling of all those to be retained to an as-new condition. Body repairs, usually to address corrosion, was then performed along with the replacement of all pipework. The body was then subject to various alterations to accommodate the revised air intakes, exhaust (of both the engine itself and the cooler group) and the modified external lighting clusters that conform to contemporary standards. The installation of the new equipment then proceeded.

GBRF stated that the complete rebuild and re-engine of each locomotive is considerably cheaper than purchasing and importing new locomotives from abroad. During February 2021, 69001 underwent trials on the Severn Valley Railway prior to its arrival at Eastleigh for painting four months later. On 26 May 2021, authorisation was received from the Office of Rail and Road, enabling the first locomotive to go into service two months later. The initial contract was for ten units, with an option for six more. By January 2023, seven locomotives had reportedly been rebuilt.

The full fleet of seven locomotives was temporarily withdrawn from service in late January 2023 in order to "investigate faults being reported by drivers". GBRf stated that they had "become aware of issues" with the locomotives, and that the period of withdrawalexpected to last for eight weekswould be used to implement improvements.

Design 
The British Rail Class 69 is a rebuild of the earlier Class 56; while the external appearance and many elements were retained, much of the internal systems were replaced with those sourced from the Class 66. It was necessary to maintain the gauge, braking characteristics, and dynamics of the original locomotive in order to avoid invoking the technical and certification requirements involved in the production of a new-build locomotive; limited certification was required, which was provided by TÜV Rheinland. The original underframe, bogies, traction motors and brake system were all retained and subject to overhauls. According to GBRf, elements of the donor locomotives, such as the bodies, wheelsets, bogie frames and suspension, traction motors, and fuel tanks were usually in good condition already or were easy to restore.

The most prominent alteration of the rebuild is the adoption of the new engine, the 12 cylinder EMD 12N-710G3B-T2; it is identical to the powerplants installed on some of the later-built Class 66 locomotives (numbers 66752–66779). Capable of producing just under , the engine is compliant with EU Stage IIIa off-road emissions standards. Due to the tight space constraints, the engine is bolted directly to the frame without any anti-vibration mounts; instead, the engine is tuned post-installation to avoid resonant vibrations. The fuel capacity is  while the route availability remains at 7.

The driver's cabs have also been heavily modernised, the changes include the installation of new measures to reduce the levels of both noise and vibration that the occupants are exposed to. Insulation has been fitted along with additional heater and fan units to provide greater comfort to the driver. To the right of the driver's position is the EMD power control pedestal, while the controls for the multiple braking systems have been installed to their left. Safety equipment includes the latest Mark IV version of the Train Protection & Warning System (TPWS) and the Automatic Warning System (AWS), while space has also been provisioned for the potential future installation of ETCS apparatus.

Throughout the locomotive, various new components and subsystems were installed, such as the compressors, blower motors, and electronic cubicles. The original electronic control system was somewhat basic, frequently being the cause of wheel spins and reduced tractive effort across all three axles on one of the bogies; in its place is the EMD EM2000 control and EMD CP5 drive systems, capable of independently monitoring the speed and load of each axle to maximise available adhesion, reducing the tendency for axle unloading and thus improving the effective tractive effort of the locomotive. The AAR multiple-working system has been installed.

Fleet details 

Details of the 16 locomotives are:

European Vehicle Numbers for the fleet are devised by prefixing the domestic locomotive number with type code 92, country code 70, and two leading zeroes; "927000...".

Notes

References

External links 

 

69
Co-Co locomotives
Diesel-electric locomotives of Great Britain
Railway locomotives introduced in 2020
Standard gauge locomotives of Great Britain